This is a list of dams and reservoirs in the U.S. state of Minnesota and pertinent data in a sortable table. There are more than 1,250 dams in the state. Over 800 are public facilities and of these 430 are owned by the Minnesota Department of Natural Resources.

This list includes the most notable structures, namely all that generate hydroelectricity, any operated by the Mississippi Valley Division of the United States Army Corps of Engineers (USACE), and all dams with reservoirs larger than 100,000 acre feet according to the USACE National Inventory of Dams Notable structures in popular recreation areas are also included, in particular those at the headwaters of the Mississippi and along the North Shore of Lake Superior. Historically significant structures as well as dams whose removal have sparked media interest are also included. Furthermore, there are many dams that have yet to be listed that call Minnesota home.

List of Minnesota dams and reservoirs

Data definitions 
Unless referenced differently, all information in the table above is from the USACE National Inventory of Dams (NID) Specific data fields are defined as follows:

Failed and removed dams 
 Berning Mill Dam, St. Michael, Minnesota – Crow River (removed after failure 1986) 
 Broken Down Dam, Fergus Falls, Minnesota – Otter Tail River (built 1908, collapsed 1909 - ruins remain in the river for recreation) 
 Flandrau Dam, New Ulm, Minnesota – Cottonwood River (built 1930, removed 1995 after repeated damage from floods) 
 Hanover Dam, Hanover, Minnesota – Crow River (removed after failure 1984) 
 Lac qui Parle Dam, Montevideo, Minnesota – Chippewa (built 1958, removed 2012) 
 Lake Florence Dam, Stewartville, Minnesota  – Root River (built 1910s, damaged 1993, removed 1994 - Lake Florence no longer exists)
 Meeker Island Lock and Dam – Mississippi River (built 1907, became obsolete and removed 1920) 
 Mill Pond Dam, Appleton, Minnesota – Pomme de Terre River (removed after being damaged in a 1997 flood) 
 Minnesota Falls Dam, Granite Falls, Minnesota – Minnesota River (built 1909, removed 2010) 
 Nevers Dam, Marine on St. Croix, Minnesota – St. Croix River (built 1889, removed 1954 after being damaged) 
 Sandstone Dam, Sandstone, Minnesota – Kettle River (20 ft tall hydropower dam built 1908, removed 1999) 
 Shady Lake Dam (Oronoco Dam), Oronoco, Minnesota – Zumbro River (built in 1937, removed 2015 after dam failure in 2010)
 Stockton Dam, Stockton, Minnesota – Garvin Brook (30 ft high mill structure built 1910, removed 1994) 
 Welch Dam, Welch, Minnesota – Cannon River (built 1890s, removed 1994)

Notes

References

See also 
 List of locks and dams of the Upper Mississippi River

External links 
 Minnesota DNR Dam Finder (Interactive)
 NPDB Dams Database National Performance of Dams Program, Stanford University

Dams in Minnesota
Reservoirs in Minnesota
Minnesota
Dams